Ziza Massika (28 January 1934 – 29 August 1959) was  an Algerian nurse who died during the Algerian War.

Legacy
 Hopital Ziza Massika in Algeria 
 Ziza Massika Primary School in Merouana

References

External links

1934 births
1959 deaths
French nurses
French women nurses
20th-century French women
Civilian casualties